The 10th Planet is a cancelled space combat game that was to be published by Bethesda Softworks.

Plot
In the distant future, the Solar System is a ravaged battlefield, and mighty starship armadas are the tools of our destruction. Using a previously unknown tenth planet orbiting the Solar System as its staging ground, an alien force plans on conquering Earth and destroying anything that gets in its way.

Development and marketing
Development on The 10th Planet began as early as 1994.  The game was originally in development by both Centropolis and Bethesda but during development Centropolis chose to stop working on the game due to Centropolis's commitments to their films. Players who pre-ordered the game would receive a copy of XCar: Experimental Racing. The game was described as Star Fox meets X-Wing; PlayStation and Saturn versions were considered.

Release
The game was originally to be released in Summer 1996.This was pushed to October 1997 and later to 1998.

References

Cancelled PC games
Cancelled PlayStation (console) games
Cancelled Sega Saturn games
XnGine games